The 1991 North Star Conference women's basketball tournament was held in Green Bay, Wisconsin. The tournament began on March 7, 1991, and ended on March 9, 1991.

North Star Conference standings

1991 North Star Conference Tournament
First round March 7, 1991, Northern Illinois 84, Cleveland State 60
First round March 7, 1991, DePaul 72, Wright State 61
First round March 7, 1991, Green Bay 82, Akron 44
First round March 7, 1991, Valparaiso 81, Illinois Chicago 73
Semifinals March 8, 1991, DePaul 91, Northern Illinois 84
Semifinals March 8, 1991, Valparaiso 72, Green Bay 69
Championship March 9, 1991, DePaul 100, Valparaiso 85

References

North Star
North Star Conference